Jamunia is a village in West Champaran district in the Indian state of Bihar.

Demographics
As of 2011 India census, Jamunia had a population of 2042 in 374 households. Males constitute 52.69% of the population and females 47.3%. Jamunia has an average literacy rate of 43.29%, lower than the national average of 74%: male literacy is 62.3%, and female literacy is 37.6%. In Jamunia, 21% of the population is under 6 years of age.

References

Villages in West Champaran district